Dany Bédar is a francophone Québécois singer from Val-d'Or in Abitibi-Témiscamingue, Quebec, Canada. At the age of 19, Bédar moved to Montreal, where he played bass guitar with the local band La Chicane from 1999 to 2007, quickly demonstrating his talents as a composer with "Tu m'manques," which earned three Félix Awards and one Juno Award.

Bèdar was the bass player for the group Sex Solution, along with follower members, Richard Gibouleau (percussionist) and Karl Coderre (singer/guitarist). Bédar launched his solo career in 2002. He has also written for several artists, including La Chicane, Boom Desjardins, Marie-Chantal Toupin, Nolwenn Leroy, Annie Villeneuve, and Marc Dupre. He also had a bilingual (French/English) hit with Joel Kroeker entitled "Déjà Vu".

Discography

 2002: Fruit de ma récente nuit blanche
 2004: Écoute-moi donc
 2004: La Tournée Boombox (with Boom Desjardins and Richard Pelland)
 2006: Acoustique... en studio !
 2007: Y'a du monde DVD
 2011: L'avocat du Yab
 2012: On a tous une histoire a cont No. 40 CAN

Awards and nominations

 28th ADISQ awards, 2005 – Pop rock album of the year Écoute-moi donc
 28th ADISQ awards, 2005 – Best male artist
 Juno Awards of 2005 – Best Selling Francophone Album (nominated) – Écoute-moi donc
 Felix Awards - to honor achievements in Quebec music in 2020

References

External links
 

Canadian pop singers
Canadian male singers
People from Val-d'Or
Living people
French-language singers of Canada
1976 births